Dolní Tošanovice is a municipality and village in Frýdek-Místek District in the Moravian-Silesian Region of the Czech Republic. It has about 400 inhabitants.

Etymology
The name is patronymic in origin derived from personal name Tosz. It was variably subscribed in the historical documents: Tessinowitz (1305), Thusnowitz (?, 1316), Tossinowicze (1445), Tossonowicze (1447, 1693), Toschonowitz (1523), Tossynowicze (1536, 1627), na Tossenowiczych (1703), Toschonowice (1724). In the 18th century the distinction between two villages developed. In 1736 both were mentioned as Nieder Toschonowitz and Ober Toschonowitz (literally "Lower" and "Upper"; Dolní and Horní in Czech).

Geography
Dolní Tošanovice lies in the Moravian-Silesian Foothills, in the historical region of Cieszyn Silesia.

History
The first written mention of Tošanovice is in a Latin document of Diocese of Wrocław called Liber fundationis episcopatus Vratislaviensis from 1305. The creation of the village was a part of a larger settlement campaign taking place in the late 13th century on the territory of what will be later known as Upper Silesia.

Politically the village belonged initially to the Duchy of Teschen. In 1327 the duchy became a fee of the Kingdom of Bohemia, which after 1526 became part of the Habsburg monarchy.

After Revolutions of 1848 in the Austrian Empire a modern municipal division was introduced in the re-established Austrian Silesia. The village as a municipality was subscribed to the political and legal district of Cieszyn. According to the censuses conducted in 1880–1910 the population of the municipality dropped from 856 in 1880 to 794 in 1910 with a majority being native Czech-speakers (83.6% in 1880, later between 62.4% and 63.9%) accompanied by a Polish-speaking minority (13.9% in 1880, later between 34.6% and 37.4%) and German-speaking (at most 21 or 2.5% in 1880). In terms of religion in 1910 the majority were Roman Catholics (76.1%), followed by Protestants (23.9%).

After World War I, Polish–Czechoslovak War and the division of Cieszyn Silesia in 1920, it became a part of Czechoslovakia. Following the Munich Agreement, in October 1938 together with the Zaolzie region it was annexed by Poland, administratively adjoined to Cieszyn County of Silesian Voivodeship. It was then annexed by Nazi Germany at the beginning of World War II. After the war it was restored to Czechoslovakia.

Transport
The D48 motorway runs through the municipality.

References

External links

 

Villages in Frýdek-Místek District
Cieszyn Silesia